Employee of the Month is a 2006 American comedy film directed by Greg Coolidge, who co-wrote it with Don Calame and Chris Conroy, and starring Dane Cook, Jessica Simpson and Dax Shepard. The film's plot revolves around two shop employees who compete for the affection of their newest co-worker. The film was shot primarily at the Costco store in Albuquerque, New Mexico. The film was released on October 6, 2006 and grossed $38 million.

Plot
For years, Zack Bradley has been working at the local "Super Club" as a box boy. He lives with his grandmother and spends his free time with co-workers Lon Neilson, Iqbal Raji, and Russell Porpis-Gunders.

Despite his slacker-like ways, Zack is kind-hearted, popular, and supportive. His rival co-worker, Vince Downey, earns Employee of the Month for the 17th time in a row. Vince comes off as charming, but is egotistical and rude towards his co-workers, including his box boy Jorge Mecico, whom he berates constantly in spite of Jorge always showing him loyalty and admiration.

When new cashier Amy Renfro is hired, Zack and Vince fall for her and compete for her affection. Zack learns from Russell that she slept with the Employee of the Month at her last job, so he decides to win the title. Amy has dinner with Vince but is repulsed when he puts the move on her. Oblivious to how Amy feels, he thinks it went well and continues pursuing her. Zack steps up his act and begins going to work on time and working harder, giving Vince competition for the title. He also goes on a date with Amy, which takes place entirely inside Super Club.

Within a few days, with Vince still winning the daily star, Zack realizes getting Employee of the Month is not so easy. With Iqbal's encouragement, Zack finds his groove and, to Vince's horror, wins the star the next day. A war of attrition begins, as Vince tries everything he can to derail Zack's string of stars, even breaking into his house one night to reset the clocks; the sabotage causes him to arrive a minute late the following day, but with Iqbal's help, Zack's attendance card indicates he arrived on time, causing the plan to fail.

Zack takes Iqbal's shift on the day of a softball game against rival chain Maxi-Mart. However, he leaves to play in the game, and Iqbal is fired. Frustrated at Zack's new attitude, his friends tell him he is turning into Vince and feel his attempt at getting the title is a result of trying to have sex with Amy. She overhears and is disgusted at Zack for his true intentions, prompting her to compare him to her last boyfriend, also an Employee of the Month with whom she indeed had sex but could not stand his attitude, which was why she requested a transfer.

At month's end, Zack and Vince are tied. On the day of the tie-breaking competition, Zack quits, gets Iqbal his job back, and tells him he took responsibility for what happened, making a heartfelt apology to Lon, Iqbal, and Russell. Zack tells them he plans to win the competition, not for recognition or to make an impression, but for pride.

When the store manager is about to announce Zack's resignation, Zack, Lon, Iqbal, and Russell show up saying Zack never filed the resignation papers. (Russell bribed the human resources manager with a Butterfinger.) Zack tries to reconcile with Amy, giving a heartfelt apology and telling her that no matter what, he is a better man thanks to her. Despite Vince's protests, the competition for the fastest checkout is held. The Employee of the Month Award will be granted to whoever finishes the task first.

Vince beats Zack only by a few seconds but, during the award ceremony, Semi, the security guard, brings a surveillance video of the competition that shows Vince throwing store products behind his back and onto the conveyor belt without scanning them. The store's assistant manager gets the receipts for the scanned items in the competition, and Vince's is not only way shorter in length, but the total cost is also less than it should be. Semi adds that videos show that Vince has been failing to ring up items all year, which has cost the store thousands of dollars. Vince is fired and Zack ends up winning the competition and rekindling his relationship with Amy.

Six weeks after being fired from Super Club, Vince is on probation, working at Maxi-Mart. Jorge now treats Vince the same as he treated him. However, while they are both sitting in Jorge's new car, when Vince asks for a ride to the bus stop, Jorge agrees. He agrees to drive Vince to the bus stop, but he deliberately moves outside the range of Vince's court-ordered ankle monitor, causing the device to shock him.

Cast
 Dane Cook as Zack Bradley
 Jessica Simpson as Amy Renfro
 Dax Shepard as Vince Downey
 Tim Bagley as Glen Garry
 Andy Dick as Lon Neilson
 Brian George as Iqbal Raji
 Harland Williams as Russell Porpis-Gunders
 Efren Ramirez as Jorge Mecico
 Sean Whalen as Dirk Dittman
 Marcello Thedford as Semi
 Danny Woodburn as Glen Ross
 Barbara Dodd as Granny

Release
The film became the #1 requested film on AOL. The film opened to $11.4 million opening weekend at #4 just behind Open Season. The film was made on a $12 million budget and earned $28.4 million in the United States and $38.4 million worldwide.

In the United Kingdom the film debuted at #4 opening with over £1,000,000 in returns.

Cook posted the following on his official website in regard to the film's box office success:

Promotion
The film received heavy promotion from not only TV stations such as MTV, which aired sneak peeks of the film every night after the "10 Spot", but a variety of websites including sites such as Perez Hilton, Myspace, and YouTube promoted the film.

Jessica Simpson also appeared on many TV shows such as The Tonight Show, The Today Show, Jimmy Kimmel Live!, and MTV's Total Request Live, where she was joined by Dane Cook to promote the film release.

Dane Cook appeared as the host of the 2006 season opener of Saturday Night Live to promote the film, though no mention of the film was made during his opening monologue or the subsequent sketches.

Cook and Simpson hosted the 2006 Teen Choice Awards in order to promote the film.

Reception
On Rotten Tomatoes the film has an approval rating of 20% based on reviews from 93 critics, with an average rating of 4.1/10. The website's consensus states: "Employee of the Month features mediocre performances, few laughs, and a lack of satiric bite." On Metacritic it has a score of 36 out of 100 on based on 24 critics, indicating "generally unfavorable reviews". Audiences surveyed by CinemaScore gave the film a grade B− on scale of A to F.

Robert Koehler of Variety saw some positives in the film saying "Camaraderie in cast is a key to pic's enjoyment, delivered by the charismatic Cook, alongside his buddies, played by Brian George, Andy Dick (for once, not manic) and Harland Williams, with Bagley, Ramirez and Woodburn in hilarious standout turns".

Film historian Leonard Maltin savaged the movie: "Jessica Simpson is a knockout in this otherwise-catastrophic splicing of Clerks and Office Space, with awful performances and no laughs whatsoever. This picture should have been buried where it was shot, in New Mexico."

Jessica Simpson earned a Razzie Award nomination for Worst Actress for her performance in the film, but lost out to Sharon Stone for Basic Instinct 2.

Home media
The DVD was released on January 26, 2007 and opened at #2 at the sales chart, selling 603,711 units which translates to $10.2m. As per the latest figures, 1,315,439 DVD units have been sold, bringing in more than $61 Million in revenue, exceeding its budget. This does not include Blu-ray sales or DVD rentals.

The 2007 region one DVD release of the film contains two commentaries: one featuring the director (Greg Coolidge) on his own, giving more technical information about the film; the second commentary features the director and star Dane Cook, who spends more time pointing out the origins of gags and actors throughout the film. The disc also contains extra improv scenes by actors Andy Dick and Harland Williams, an alternate opening with Eva Longoria showing Vince and Zack's first day on the job watching a video tape for new employees, an "At Work with Lon" feature showing Dick in character attempting to help to customers at Super Club, plus trailers for other Lionsgate films.

References

External links
 
 

2006 films
2006 romantic comedy films
American romantic comedy films
Films scored by John Swihart
Films set in New Mexico
Films shot in New Mexico
Lionsgate films
Workplace comedy films
2000s English-language films
2000s American films